Turkey competed at the 1984 Summer Olympics in Los Angeles, United States.  The nation returned to the Summer Games after participating in the American-led boycott of the 1980 Summer Olympics. 46 competitors, 45 men and 1 woman, took part in 49 events in 10 sports.

Medalists

Archery

In its first Olympic archery competition, Turkey was represented by two men.

Men's Individual Competition:
 Kemal Erer — 2386 points (→ 40th place)
 Izzet Avçi — 2361 points (→ 45th place)

Athletics

Men
Track & road events

Women
Track & road events

Boxing

Men's Light Flyweight (– 48 kg)
 Mustafa Genç
 First Round — Lost to Carlos Motta (GUA), 0:5

Men's Bantamweight (– 54 kg)
 Çemal Öner
 First Round — Bye
 Second Round — Defeated Bararq Bahtobe (CIV), 4-1
 Third Round — Lost to Pedro Decima (ARG), 1-4

Fencing

Two fencers, both men, represented Turkey in 1984.

Men's foil
 Haluk Yamaç

Men's épée
 Ali Murat Dizioğlu

Judo

Sailing

Shooting

Swimming

Men's 100m Freestyle
Kemal Sabri Özün
 Heat — 53.39 (→ did not advance, 35th place)

Gökhan Attaroglu
 Heat — 54.22 (→ did not advance, 43rd place)

Men's 200m Freestyle
Gökhan Attaroglu
 Heat — 1:55.92 (→ did not advance, 32nd place)

Men's 400m Freestyle
Ahmet Nakkas
 Heat — 4:07.07 (→ did not advance, 29th place)

Gökhan Attaroglu
 Heat — 54.22 (→ did not advance, 30th place)

Men's 1500m Freestyle 
Ahmet Nakkas
 Heat — DNS (→ did not advance, no ranking)

Men's 100m Butterfly
Ihsan Sadri Özün
 Heat — 56.55 (→ did not advance, 24th place)

Kemal Sadri Özün
 Heat — 57.75 (→ did not advance, 35th place)

Men's 200m Butterfly
Ihsan Sadri Özün
 Heat — 2:07.45 (→ did not advance, 26th place)

Men's 200m Individual Medley
Gökhan Attaroglu
 Heat — DSQ (→ did not advance, no ranking)

Men's 4 × 100 m Freestyle Relay 
Kemal Sadri Özün, Ihsan Sadri Özün, Ahmed Nakkas, and Gökhan Attaroglu
 Heat — 3:36.54 (→ did not advance, 19th place)

Men's 4 × 200 m Freestyle Relay 
Gökhan Attaroglu, Kemal Sabri Özün, Ahmed Nakkas, and Ihsan Sadri Özün
 Heat — 7:59.36 (→ did not advance, 12th place)

Weightlifting

Wrestling

References

Nations at the 1984 Summer Olympics
1984
1984 in Turkish sport